Etherlibrium is the debut album by rapper/producer Ron Browz, which was released on July 20, 2010.

Background
Guest appearances on the album include Maino, Red Cafe, J.R. Writer and others as well.

On the topic of Etherlibrium being released on iTunes only and his original debut album, Etherboy being shelved, Ron Browz explained his feelings towards these things happening below:

Ron Browz discussed to why the idea of Etherlibrium being released came about below:

Music videos
A video was released for "Good Morning" on June 4, 2010, on July 12, 2010, for "Half Time 2010", on July 20, 2010, for "In a Zone", and on September 7, 2010, for "Wishing on a Star".

Track listing

References

2010 debut albums
Albums produced by Ron Browz
ITunes-exclusive releases
Ron Browz albums